High, middle and low justices are notions dating from Western feudalism to indicate descending degrees of judicial power to administer justice by the maximal punishment the holders could inflict upon their subjects and other dependents.

Low justice regards the level of day-to-day civil actions, including voluntary justice, minor pleas, and petty offences generally settled by fines or light corporal punishment. It was held by many lesser authorities, including many lords of the manor, who sat in justice over the serfs, unfree tenants, and freeholders on their land. 
Middle justice would involve full civil and criminal jurisdiction, except for capital crimes, and notably excluding the right to pass the death penalty, torture and severe corporal punishment, which was reserved to authorities holding high justice, or the ius gladii ("right of the sword").

Pyramid of feudal justice
Although the terms high and low suggest a strict subordination, this was not quite the case; a case could often be brought in any of several courts, with the principle of "prevention" (in the etymological sense of Latin praevenire, "to come before") granting jurisdiction to the court in which the case was first filed or otherwise brought.

As a rule, each court administered justice in general (criminal cases were generally not separate from civil actions and other types of justice, while certain matters were separated such as canon law), as long as the matter was not reserved for a higher court or by virtue of some privilegium fori (e.g., of clerics to be judged in canon courts by other clergy, sometimes under ecclesiastical law, the origin of the English common-law concept—benefit of clergy). In addition to civil and criminal trials, the notion of justice also included voluntary justice, which is really the official recording of deeds (unilateral or bilateral) such as marital agreements, wills, grants, etc.

A right of appeal was not automatically available, only when explicitly established, and if so not always to a court of the superior political level or a higher degree of the trio. In fact, feudal justice was a labyrinth of specific customs and rules in nearly endless variation, not governed by any clear legal logic, and subject to significant historical evolution in time, though the largely customary law tended by nature to be quite conservative. In judicial matters—as in all spheres of life—feudal society did not see uniformity as either possible or necessarily desirable, each town and region having its own customs and ways of doing things, and resented attempts to interfere with them.

While the right of justice is held by many "unique" courts, relatively strong states make it a pillar of their absolutist (re)emergence to establish numerous courts to administer justice in their name in different territorial circumscriptions, such as the royal (high) sheriffs in England, or to impose an appeal (at least unifying the law as such) to a royal court, as to the various French provincial parlements.

High justice

High justice, also known as  ius gladii ("right of the sword") or in German as Blutgerichtsbarkeit, Blutgericht (lit. "blood justice", "blood-court"; sometimes also Halsgericht, lit. "neck-justice", or peinliches Gericht) is the highest penal authority, including capital punishment, as held by a sovereign—the sword of justice and hand of justice are regalia that symbolize it.  In the early Holy Roman Empire, high justice was reserved to the king. From the 13th century, it was transferred to the king's vassals along with their fiefs.
The first codification of capital punishment was the Halsgerichtsordnung passed by Maximilian I in 1499, followed in 1507 by the Constitutio Criminalis Bambergensis. Both codes formed the basis of the Constitutio Criminalis Carolina (CCC), passed in  1532 under Charles V. In the Habsburg monarchy, all regional codes were superseded by the Constitutio Criminalis Theresiana in 1768.

The Blutbanner ("blood banner") or Blutfahne ("blood flag") was a solid red flag. It was presented to feudal lords as a symbol of their power of high jurisdiction (Blutgerichtsbarkeit) together with the heraldic banner of the fief. Some feudal houses adopted a red field symbolic of the blood banner into their coat of arms, the so-called Regalienfeld.
The Talschaft (forest canton) of Schwyz used the blood banner as a war flag from ca. 1240, and was later incorporated into the flag of Schwyz and the flag of Switzerland.

Often it is proudly displayed, in the form of relevant status symbols. Thus permanent gallows are often erected in prominent public places; the very word for them in French, potence, is derived from the Latin "potentia" meaning "power".

High justice is held by all states and the highest vassals in the European type of feudal society, but may also be acquired by other authorities as part of a high degree of legal autonomy, such as certain cities; which in time often obtained other high privileges originally reserved for high nobility and sometimes high clergy.  Other such privileges could include a seat in a diet or a similar feudal representative assembly, before the third estate as such even aspired to such "parliamentary" representation, or the right to mint coins. These privileges indicating its so-called liberty was an "equal" enclave in the territorial jurisdiction of the neighboring feudal (temporal or ecclesiastical) Lord, sometimes even extending rather like a polis in Antiquity.

Not every Vogt held high justice. Up to the 18th century, for example, the blood court of much of what is now the canton of Zürich lay with Kyburg, even in the territory ruled by the counts of Greifensee.  The self-administration of the blood court was an important factor of Imperial immediacy.

See also
 Landgericht (medieval)
 Private jurisdiction

References

Richard J. Evans, Rituals of Retribution: Capital Punishment in Germany, 1600-1987, Oxford University Press (1996).

Feudalism
Justice
Medieval law
Early Modern law
Legal history of the Holy Roman Empire

de:Niedere Gerichtsbarkeit
de:Hochgerichtsbarkeit